Cătălin Tănase (n. February 19, 1962 in Epureni, Vaslui County) is a Romanian biologist (mycologist and botanist), professor at the "Alexandru Ioan Cuza" University of Iaşi. He is also director of the "Anastasie Fătu" Botanical Garden of Iaşi. He was elected a correspondent member of the Romanian Academy in 2018.

References

Romanian botanists
Corresponding members of the Romanian Academy
Living people
Year of birth missing (living people)